Union Civil War Fortification, also known as Bulltown Civil War Site, is a historic archaeological site located near Napier, Braxton County, West Virginia. The site relates to the American Civil War Battle of Bulltown, that took place on October 13, 1863.  During test excavations in the 1970s, remnants of structures, features, and artifacts were recovered.  The site was purchased by the Army Corps of Engineers during the development of Burnsville Lake, and is administered as part of the Bulltown Historic Area.

It was listed on the National Register of Historic Places in 1984.

See also
Cunningham House and Outbuildings

References

American Civil War forts
American Civil War sites in West Virginia
Archaeological sites on the National Register of Historic Places in West Virginia
Braxton County, West Virginia in the American Civil War
Forts in West Virginia
National Register of Historic Places in Braxton County, West Virginia
Conflict sites on the National Register of Historic Places in West Virginia